Ara Vartanian (born 1975) is a Brazilian-Armenian jeweller and best known as the founder of his eponymous jewellery house.

Early life and education
Vartanian was born into a family of jewellers in Beirut, Lebanon, and spent his early life in São Paulo, Brazil surrounded by precious stones. Vartanian gained a degree in Economics from Boston University before locating to New York City in 1998 to work as a trader on the NASDAQ. In 2000, Vartanian left the financial market to return to Brazil and dedicate himself to designing jewellery.

Career 
In 2000, Vartanian founded his eponymous jewellery house  and has since developed the use of innovative jewellery settings including; two and three-finger rings, ‘Octopus’ rings, signature ‘Hook’ earrings  and his distinctive use of inverted diamonds. Vartanian uses the gemstone as the main source of inspiration for his designs, creating the structure around the stone.
 
In 2002, Vartanian began to sell his pieces internationally in New York and opened his São Paulo showroom in 2005. This was followed by store openings in Sao Paulo (2010) and Rio de Janeiro (2012).  This was followed by a collaboration with Unbreakable Hope campaign of GRAACC in 2014 to raise money for children with cancer.

Vartanian opened his first flagship outside of Brazil in Mayfair, London on Bruton Place in 2016 in a section of Baron Saatchi’s former home. Vartanian’s creations have been worn by celebrities including Naomi Campbell, Penélope Cruz and Madonna.

Collaborations 
Vartanian has worked on various collaborations with different artists including; the Brazilian artist Ernesto Neto (2002), Brazilian decorative lighting brand Scatto (2009), German artist Janaina Tschäpe (2013)  and with Brazilian furniture designer Hugo França (2016). Vartanian often designs with his wife in mind, former model Sabrina Gasperin, who he sees as a muse for the brand. Gasperin in turn, designs with Vartanian for her Sabrina by Ara Vartanian line, which includes the 2011 collection Mothers and Daughters.

In 2017 he launched a new collection in collaboration with British supermodel Kate Moss named Kate Moss X Ara Vartanian .

References

External links 
 Official webpage

Brazilian jewellers
1975 births
Living people
Lebanese emigrants to Brazil
Artists from Beirut
People from São Paulo
Brazilian jewellery designers
Jewellery companies of Brazil
Brazilian people of Armenian descent
Businesspeople from São Paulo
Brazilian male artists
Boston University College of Arts and Sciences alumni